Staffan Lindeberg (1950–2016) was an associate professor of family medicine at the Department of Medicine,  University of Lund,  Sweden. He was a practicing GP at St Lars Primary Health Care Center, Lund, Sweden. Lindeberg researched the paleolithic diet.

Works

Dissertation
 Apparent absence of cerebrocardiovascular disease in Melanesians. Risk factors and nutritional considerations – the Kitava Study (Lund, Sweden: Lund University, 1994)

Published research articles
 Cardiovascular risk factors in a Melanesian population apparently free from stroke and ischaemic heart disease: the Kitava study (Journal of Internal Medicine. 1994 Sep;236(3):331-40.)

Books
 Food and Western Disease: Health and nutrition from an evolutionary perspective (Wiley-Blackwell, December 2009)

See also 
 Paleolithic diet
 Hunter-gatherer
 Stanley Boyd Eaton, researcher
 Melvin Konner, researcher
 Loren Cordain, researcher

References 

1950 births
2016 deaths
Swedish general practitioners
Lund University alumni
Academic staff of Lund University
Nutritionists
Paleolithic diet advocates